Fort Morgan virus is an RNA virus in the genus Alphavirus. It is an Alphavirus isolated from nesting Cliff Swallows, House Sparrows and from cimicid bugs in eastern Colorado for which the name Fort Morgan virus was proposed.

References

External links 
Wikilinks
Fort Morgan, Colorado
Petrochelidon
House sparrow
Browsing Links
https://researchexperts.utmb.edu/en/publications/characterization-of-fort-morgan-virus-an-alphavirus-of-the-wester
https://wwwn.cdc.gov/arbocat/VirusDetails.aspx?ID=151&SID=9
https://www.genome.jp/virushostdb/48544

Alphaviruses
RNA viruses